Boeuf or Bœuf may refer to:

Place name
Boeuf River, Arkansas
Boeuf Township, Franklin County, Missouri
Boeuf Township, Gasconade County, Missouri

Surname
Alexis Bœuf (born 1986), French biathlete
Dominique Boeuf (born 1968), French jockey
Georges Bœuf (1937–2020), French composer, musician, and saxophonist

See also
LeBoeuf (disambiguation)
Beef